Fusiform means having a spindle-like shape that is wide in the middle and tapers at both ends. It is similar to the lemon-shape, but often implies a focal broadening of a structure that continues from one or both ends, such as an aneurysm on a blood vessel.

Examples 
 Fusiform, a body shape common to many aquatic animals, characterized by being tapered at both the head and the tail
 Fusiform, a classification of aneurysm
 Fusiform bacteria (spindled rods, that is, fusiform bacilli), such as the Fusobacteriota
 Fusiform cell (biology)
 Fusiform face area, a part of the human visual system which seems to specialize in facial recognition
 Fusiform gyrus, part of the temporal lobe of the brain
 Fusiform muscle, where the fibres run parallel along the length of the muscle
 Fusiform neuron, a spindle-shaped neuron

References 

Geometric shapes

See also 
 Streamliner, a fusiform hydro-/aero-dynamic vehicle. Historically, the adjective "streamlined" was more commonly used among designers for the word "fusiform".